Russell Irving (born 4 January 1964) is an English former professional footballer.

Biography
Born in Wallsend, Irving played for the Wallsend Boys Club, before joining Ipswich Town. He failed to make a first team appearance for the club, and joined Colchester United in 1984. After 50 league appearances, he signed for non-League Sudbury Town in 1986.

In 1987 Irving moved to New Plymouth, New Zealand to play for the New Plymouth Old Boys in the Central League. He returned to England in 1988. In 1989 Irving signed a one-year contract with Moturoa AFC, scoring 13 goals and helping the club gain promotion to the Central League First Division. In 1990 Irving returned to New Plymouth Old Boys, who had gained promotion to the New Zealand National League. Irving also represented the Taranaki provincial team in inter-regional tournaments of the time while living in New Zealand.

References

External links
Russell Irving at Colchester United Archive Database

1964 births
Sportspeople from Wallsend
Footballers from Tyne and Wear
Wallsend Boys Club players
English footballers
Ipswich Town F.C. players
Colchester United F.C. players
Sudbury Town F.C. players
New Plymouth Rangers players
Moturoa AFC players
Living people
Association football forwards